Port Arthur Independent School District is a public school district based in Port Arthur, Texas, United States.

The district serves most of Port Arthur and a portion of Groves.

In 2012, the school district was rated "academically acceptable" by the Texas Education Agency.

Administration
The district is headed by the PAISD School Board, which is ultimately responsible for the well-being of the district. It hires a superintendent of schools who is chiefly responsible for overseeing the day-to-day affairs of the district. This superintendent accomplishes this with the aid of other individuals and groups that the administration comprises. The current superintendent is Dr. Mark Porterie.

History
Prior to 1965 schools were segregated by race: White students attended Thomas Jefferson High School. Black students attended two elementary schools, Carver Elementary School and Lamar Elementary School, as well as Franklin Junior High School and Lincoln High School.

Dress code
The Port Arthur Independent School District adopted a uniform dress code that was enforced district-wide during the 2007–2008 school year.

Student body

In 2001 the racial breakdown of the student body was: 58% black, 21% Hispanic, 13% white, and 8% Asian.

Schools

High schools
 Memorial High School (10th-12th) (Port Arthur) 
 P.A. Memorial 9th Grade Academy (9th) (Port Acres) 
 Woodrow Wilson Early College High School (9th-12th) (Downtown Port Arthur) 
 Career and Technology Center
 Stilwell Technical Center  (Port Arthur)

Middle schools
 Grades 6–8
 Thomas Jefferson Middle School
 Abraham Lincoln Middle School

Elementary schools
 Grades PK-5
 DeQueen Elementary School  (Port Arthur)
 Dick Dowling Elementary School (Port Acres)
 Sam Houston Elementary School (Port Arthur)
 Robert E. Lee Elementary School (Port Arthur)
 William B. Travis Elementary School (Port Arthur)
 Tyrrell Elementary School (Griffing Park)
 Booker T. Washington Technology School (West Port Arthur) 
 Staff Sgt. Lucian Adams Elementary (Port Arthur)
 Pre-Kindergarten
 Wheatley School of Early Childhood (Port Arthur)

Alternative schools
 Port Arthur Alternative Campus

Former schools

Former high schools
 Stephen F. Austin High School (consolidated into Memorial High)
 Abraham Lincoln High School (consolidated into Memorial High)
 Thomas Jefferson High School (consolidated into Memorial High)
 Bishop Byrne High School (closed in 1983)

Former middle schools
 Woodrow Wilson Middle School (Moved to ALMS)
 Thomas A. Edison Middle School (Moved to TJMS)
 Stephen F. Austin Middle School (Became MHS-9)

Former elementary schools
 Franklin Elementary School (built in 1917. demolished in February 2012)
 Pease Elementary School (demolished)
Lamar Elementary School (later used an alternative school before being demolished)

References

External links
 

School districts in Jefferson County, Texas
Port Arthur, Texas